Leonard “Leon” Richardson (born 12 February 1957) is an Antiguan former cyclist. He competed in the sprint and 1000m time trial events at the 1984 Summer Olympics.

References

External links
 

1957 births
Living people
Antigua and Barbuda male cyclists
Olympic cyclists of Antigua and Barbuda
Cyclists at the 1984 Summer Olympics
Place of birth missing (living people)